The 1930 Utah Utes football team was an American football team that represented the University of Utah as a member of the Rocky Mountain Conference (RMC) during the 1930 college football season. In their sixth year under head coach Ike Armstrong, the Utes compiled an overall record of 8–0 record with a mark of 7–0 in conference play, won their third consecutive RMC championship, shut out five of eight opponents, and outscored all opponents by a total of 340 to 20. The team's average of 42.5 points per game was a school record for more than 70 years until 2004. The total winning margin of 320 points remains a school record.

Ray Price was the team captain. Three Utah players received recognition on the 1930 All-America team: center Marvin Jonas (2nd team, Consolidated Press); end George Watkins (2nd team, Allen J. Gould); and sophomore fullback Frank Christensen (3rd team, INS). Christen scored 98 points, setting a school scoring record that lasted until 1989.

Schedule

References

Utah
Utah Utes football seasons
Rocky Mountain Athletic Conference football champion seasons
College football undefeated seasons
Utah Utes football